Roghaye Someh (Persian: رقیه صومعه; born March 25, 2002, in Gorgan) is an Iranian futsal player. She was called up to the Under-14 national football team at the age of 10 and has been a regular member of the women's national football team since then. At the age of 15, Someh decided to play futsal, and after succeeding in the basic age categories of the Iranian women's national football team, she became a member of the Iranian women's national youth futsal team.

She is currently a member of the Peykan Tehran women's futsal team.

Someh has a history of accompanying the Iranian women's national youth futsal team in the Cafa 2020 tournament. He showed a brilliant performance in these competitions and was able to win the title of the best scorer of the competitions.

Honors with National Team 
Third place with the Iranian women's soccer toddler team in the regional football competitions of South and Central Asia - 2014 Sri Lanka

Runner-up with the Iranian women's soccer teenagers team in the South and Central Asia Regional Football Tournament - 2014 Bangladesh

Cafa 2020 championship with Iranian women's national youth futsal team

The best scorer of Cafa 2020 competitions

Iranian Women's Futsal Premier League championship with Namino Isfahan team in 2018

References 

2002 births
Living people
Iranian women's footballers
Iran women's international footballers
Iranian women's futsal players
People from Gorgan
Women's association footballers not categorized by position